Ivan Kozák (born 18 June 1970) is a Slovak former professional footballer who played for FK Dukla Banská Bystrica, 1. FC Košice, MFK Ružomberok and German teams Tennis Borussia Berlin and 1. FC Union Berlin. He made 38 appearances for Slovakia.

Kozák was a leader of the 1. FC Košice defense in the championship winning seasons of 1997 and 1998, and also in the 1997–98 UEFA Champions League campaign. Nowadays he is working in the structures of MFK Košice.

Career statistics

References

External links 
 
 
 Ivan Kozák at the MFK Košice website 

1970 births
Living people
Sportspeople from Považská Bystrica
Czechoslovak footballers
Slovak footballers
Czechoslovakia under-21 international footballers
Slovakia international footballers
Association football defenders
Slovak Super Liga players
2. Bundesliga players
FC VSS Košice players
Tennis Borussia Berlin players
K.S.C. Lokeren Oost-Vlaanderen players
1. FC Union Berlin players
Slovak expatriate footballers
Slovak expatriate sportspeople in Germany
Expatriate footballers in Germany
Slovak expatriate sportspeople in Belgium
Expatriate footballers in Belgium